Below is a sortable list of compositions by Louis Vierne.  The works are categorized by genre, opus number, date of composition and titles.

Sources
 Catalogue of Vierne's Works Compiled by Bernard Gavoty

References

External links
 Louis Vierne: French Composer, Organist, Teacher

Vierne, Louis